Trystan Gravelle (born 4 May 1981) is a Welsh theatre, film and television actor.

Life and career 
Gravelle was born in the Welsh village of Trimsaran in Carmarthenshire. He attended Ysgol Gyfun Y Strade. He was a member of the Llanelli Youth Theatre between 1997 and 1999 before becoming a student at the Royal Academy of Dramatic Art.

After graduation from RADA, Gravelle joined the Royal Shakespeare Company.

In 2010 he performed D.C. Moore's monologue Honest at the Edinburgh Fringe Festival at Milne's Bar as part of the Assembly programme.

In 2011 he appeared opposite Rhys Ifans and Vanessa Redgrave in the feature film Anonymous, which contests the authorship of Shakespeare's plays, as Christopher Marlowe. Gravelle missed attending the film's London premiere due to starring in a London production of Mike Bartlett's National Theatre production 13.

In 2012 he joined the main cast of the ITV period drama series Mr Selfridge as Victor Colleano, assistant manager of the department store's restaurant. In the summer of 2012 he was named one of the 'Stars of Tomorrow' by Screen International. Gravelle filmed Mr Selfridge between April and October, and the series débuted in the United Kingdom in January 2013.

In 2016 Gravelle played the young Paul Finchley in the Channel 4 drama National Treasure.

In 2018 Gravelle played the vampire, Baldwin Montclair, in the Sky One Production A Discovery of Witches.

In 2022, he played Pharazôn in The Lord of the Rings: The Rings of Power series on Amazon Prime. Co-star Morfydd Clark mentioned enjoying speaking in Welsh on-set with Gravelle and Owain Arthur.

Selected credits

References

External links
 

Living people
Welsh male film actors
Welsh male stage actors
Welsh male television actors
People from Carmarthenshire
Alumni of RADA
1981 births